Oarisma edwardsii, or Edwards's skipperling, is a species of grass skipper in the family of butterflies known as Hesperiidae. It was first described by William Barnes in 1897 and it is found in Central and North America.

The MONA or Hodges number for Oarisma edwardsii is 4008.

References

Further reading

 

Hesperiinae
Articles created by Qbugbot
Butterflies described in 1897